The Uganda Fed Cup team represents Uganda in Fed Cup tennis competition and are governed by the Uganda Tennis Association. They will take part in the Fed Cup for the first time in 2018, competing in the Europe/Africa Zone Group III.

Current team
Most recent year-end rankings are used.

History
Uganda will compete in its first Fed Cup in 2018.

Players

References

External links
 

Billie Jean King Cup teams
Fed Cup
Fed Cup